Suola is a rural locality (a selo), the only inhabited locality, and the administrative center of Moruksky Rural Okrug of Megino-Kangalassky District in the Sakha Republic, Russia, located  from Nizhny Bestyakh, the administrative center of the district. Its population as of the 2010 Census was 426, of whom 216 were male and 210 female, down from 514 as recorded during the 2002 Census.

It is one of the centers of population located in the Suola River basin.

References

Notes

Sources
Official website of the Sakha Republic. Registry of the Administrative-Territorial Divisions of the Sakha Republic. Megino-Kangalassky District. 

Rural localities in Megino-Kangalassky District